Dryvyaty – is a lake in Braslaw District, Vitebsk Region, in Belarus. This is the largest lake of the Braslaw Lakes and fifth the largest lake of the country.

References 

Lakes of Vitebsk Region
Braslaw District